Lowell City Airport  is a city-owned public-use airport located one mile (2 km) north of the central business district of Lowell, a city in Kent County, Michigan, United States.

Facilities and aircraft 

For the 12-month period ending December 31, 2005, the airport had an average of 48 operations per week. At that time there were 18 aircraft based at this airport: 100% single-engine. 

Fixed-base operations are provided by Midwest Aviation Services.

Incidents and accidents 
On August 24, 2014, at about 11:30 AM, a man trying out a newly bought experimental plane was spotted erratically taxiing down runway 6. After taking off, the pilot flew around the airport for about five minutes before going in to land. The approach was noted to be too steep and too fast. The plane eventually reached a good speed 1,000 feet down the runway, and leveled off before descending further at a high angle. The plane bounced and then exited the runway, stopping in some shrubbery. The pilot, despite being told not to, got the airplane back on the runway and did a 180 to align with the runway. The pilot applied full throttle and the plane abruptly turned right, veering off the runway. The airplane continued going perpendicular to the runway. It was angled at a very high attack rate and rolled to the right. The plane crashed into trees 100 yards South of the departure runway. The cause was determined to be pilot error. The pilot was killed in the crash.

On January 19, 2015, a student pilot attempting a solo landing clipped pine trees short of the runway. The victim crashed on the driveway of a private residence, coming extremely close to the house. The victim was able to get out of the plane and go to the house for help, where he was sent to the hospital. The student pilot did survive the crash.

References

External links 
 at Michigan Airport Directory
Airport Board Minutes & Agendas at City of Lowell website

Airports in Michigan
Transportation buildings and structures in Kent County, Michigan